María Cornelia Olivares (fl. 1817), was one of the national heroines of the Chilean War of Independence.

References

 https://es.wikisource.org/wiki/Las_mujeres_de_la_independencia/XII

Women in 19th-century warfare
People of the Chilean War of Independence
Year of birth missing
Year of death missing